Michael John Twomey (25 September 1931 – 14 December 2015) was an Australian rules footballer who played for the Collingwood Football Club in the Victorian Football League (VFL).

At 185cm (6'1") in height, Collingwood's Mick Twomey was taller than his brothers Bill and Pat. Recruited from Yarra Valley, he played most of his 157 VFL games between 1951 and 1961 as a ruckman. In fact he was short for a ruckman; but he had remarkable spring, and newspapers often carried photos of him seeming to soar over opponents.  In the 1958 VFL Grand Final, for instance, the highlights footage from Channel 7 shows him contesting ruck hit-outs and marks with opposing ruckmen who were 11 cm  and 13 cm taller. 

Over the course of his 10-year career Twomey was a member of five Collingwood Grand Final teams, enjoying premiership success in 1953 and 1958. He died in 2015.

References

External links

Australian rules footballers from Victoria (Australia)
Australian people of Irish descent
Collingwood Football Club players
Collingwood Football Club Premiership players
Ballarat Football Club players
Place of death missing
1931 births
2015 deaths
Two-time VFL/AFL Premiership players